Boubacar Fofana may refer to:
Boubacar Fofana (footballer, born 1989), Guinean football defensive midfielder
Boubacar Fofana (footballer, born 1998), French football winger